Kumo may refer to:

 Kokemäki, Kumo in Swedish, a municipality of Finland
 Kumo (album), album released by D'espairsRay in 2000
 Kumo (musician) (born 1965), British musician and composer
 Kumo (sculpture), a public art work by Isaac Witkin in Milwaukee, Wisconsin, US
 Kumo (search engine), a previous Microsoft search engine (now Bing)
 Kumo Xi, ancient Manchurian people
 KUMO-LD, Retro Television Network affiliate
 Japanese term for spider ("蜘蛛") or Cloud ("雲"), the latter one also being used in English as part of the Ichimoku Kinkō Hyō analysis method
 Kumo, abbreviation and nickname of Kumoricon, an anime convention from Portland, Oregon, named after the word Cloudy (曇り)
 Kumo, Nigeria,  a city in Akko local government area in Gombe state, Nigeria